Vijay Singh Gurjar was from Kunja Bahadurpur.

Family 
After death of Ram Dayal, British reassessed his estate and decided that many of the villages were not his property. Thus, in 1813 British cancelled contracts of many villages which were with Ram Dayal. The administrative setup implemented land reforms and granted villages to the village officials, rather than being under one person. Still, a sizeable number of villages were left in hands of the widow of Ram Dayal, his son Badan Singh and 6 other Taluqdars.

In 1817, Chaudhari Vijay Singh, a remote cousin of Ram Dayal succeeded to one of these Taluqa, Kunja Bahadurpur covering 33 villages and paying 22,000 rupees annually to British. He wrote to British Collector Archibald Murray, narrating story of his hardship as he had to dispose of his horses, valuables to repay his debt. Vijay Singh was dependent of Shaikh Kallan of Sharanpur district who used him for expanding his own tasks of land purchase, intimidating of rivals etc.

Ambition and death of Vijay Singh 
In 1824, there were rumours that British have became weak and they will soon return to Britain on their own. With infant Kushal Singh in Landhaura, Vijay Singh wanted to dispose off him and Badan Singh (son of Ram Dayal) and declare himself as head of Gurjars and start revenue collection from all villages, which were earlier under Ram Dayal.

To realise his plan of becoming the head of Gurjars, Vijay Singh aligned with Kallu Gurjar, a dacoit with reward of 1000 rupees on his head. Kallu Gurjar, who was from Muradabad district and was active for years in Nagina and Haridwar. He had shifted to Saharanpur district in 1823. Gaining strength from this alliance, Kallu became more daring and started attacking, looting and killing officials, Mahajans, travellers and other common citizens of the region.

Vijay Singh's village Kunja became base for Kallu Gurjar. Once Police came chasing Kallu to Kunja, Vijay Singh accompanied by Ishq Lal and others and levelled matchlocks against policemen, who returned after being outnumbered. With more Gurjars joining gang of Kallu and Vijay Singh, Kallu declared himself a Raja, styled as Raja Kalyan Singh and launched multiple attacks to loot and kill people in Sept and Oct 1824.

References 

History of India
Year of birth missing
Place of birth missing
Year of death missing
Place of death missing